The Piano Concerto No. 8 in A-flat major, Op. 151 "Gruss an den Rhein", by Ferdinand Ries was composed around 1826 and published in 1829 by Simrock. While still showing the structural influence of Beethoven's piano concertos, the writing for the piano is more akin to that of later composers such as Chopin, Mendelssohn & Schumann.

Composition history

Ries composed this work in 1826, some two years after his return from England and approximately two years after the publication of the last of his early piano concerti (Opp. 123 & 132). Allan Badley comments that this would most likely make it the seventh of Ries's eight piano concertos to be written.  As he was no longer an active concert pianist publication by N. Simrock, bearing a dedication to Godefroi Weber followed within a year.

Structure

The concerto follows the traditional three-movement structure:

 Allegro con moto
 Larghetto con moto 
 Rondo: Allegro molto

A typical performance of the work lasts around 28 to 30 minutes.

Recordings

Notable recordings of this composition include:

References
Notes

Sources

External links

08
1826 compositions
Compositions in A-flat major
Music with dedications